Number 99 Squadron is a squadron of the Royal Air Force which operates the Boeing C-17 Globemaster III strategic/tactical transport aircraft from RAF Brize Norton.

The squadron conducts global deployments on behalf of the British Armed Forces and the UK Government, notably delivering emergency aid during natural disasters and supporting military operations overseas.

No. 99 was a bomber squadron in both World War I and World War II. The squadron was the first RAF unit to receive the Avro Aldershot, Handley Page Hyderabad, Handley Page Hinaidi, Vickers Wellington, Bristol Britannia and Boeing Globemaster. In case of the Avro Aldershot the squadron was its only operator, as it is now for the Globemasters.

History

World War I
What would later become No. 99 (Madras Presidency) Squadron was originally formed at Yatesbury, Wiltshire, England on 15 August 1917 from elements supplied by No. 13 Training Squadron, RFC. It was equipped with de Havilland DH.9 bombers in 1918, deploying to France to form part of the Independent Air Force, the RAF's strategic bombing force. It flew its first mission on 21 May and continued to take part in large scale daylight raids against targets in Germany, sustaining heavy losses due both to the unreliable nature of the DH.9 and heavy German opposition. As an example, during one raid against railway targets in Saarbrücken on 31 July 1918, seven out of nine aircraft from 99 Squadron were shot down, with a further three DH.9s turning back with engine trouble before the formation crossed the enemy lines 99 Squadron was withdrawn from the front line on 25 September to be re-equipped with de Havilland DH.9A bombers, and it was still in the process of converting when the war ended. During the war it had taken part in 76 bombing raids, dropping 61 tons of bombs and claiming 12 German aircraft, of which eight were during the raid of 31 July.

In 1919 the squadron was sent to India, flying patrols over the North-West Frontier from Mianwali and Kohat during the Mahsud and Waziristan campaigns. It was disbanded by being renumbered to No. 27 Squadron on 1 April 1920.

Inter-war period
No. 99 Squadron reformed on 1 April 1924 at Netheravon, Wiltshire, flying Vickers Vimys. In May 1924, it moved to RAF Bircham Newton in Norfolk, uniquely receiving the Avro Aldershot single-engined heavy bomber. These were replaced at the end of 1925 by twin-engined Handley Page Hyderabads, the squadron moving to RAF Upper Heyford in December 1927. In 1929, it again switched to new aircraft when it began receiving Handley Page Hinaidis, a radial engined derivative of the Hyderabad. By 1933, the Hinaidi, which was little improvement over bombers in use during the First World War, was recognised as obsolete, and in November the unit received the first production Handley Page Heyford heavy bombers. While these carried twice the bombload of the earlier aircraft, and had significantly better performance, they soon became outclassed. However, 99 Squadron, which had moved to RAF Mildenhall in November 1934, was obliged to retain the Heyford until October 1938, when it converted to Vickers Wellington monoplanes. In September 1935, "B" flight of 99 Squadron was split off to form 38 Squadron, while on 12 April 1937 the squadron again detached "B" flight, this time to form 149 Squadron.

World War II

The squadron was the first unit to be equipped with Vickers Wellingtons, just before the start of World War II. It flew its first operational mission of the war on the night of 8/9 September 1939, when three Wellingtons set off from Mildenhall to drop leaflets over Germany. The squadron temporarily dispersed to RAF Elmdon (now Birmingham Airport) the next day before moving to a more permanent new home at RAF Newmarket, Suffolk on 15 September. On 14 December 1939, 12 Wellingtons of the squadron set off for an armed reconnaissance of the Schillig Roads, hoping to attack a force of German warships spotted by a British submarine the previous night. While the formation encountered the German warships, the cloud base was too low to bomb the ships, and five of the bombers were lost over the North Sea, one shot down by anti-aircraft fire, three by German fighters and one lost in a collision. A further Wellington crashed on return to base. The squadron was a part of No. 3 Group RAF, Bomber Command and bombed targets in Norway and Germany, mainly at night. It moved to the newly established base at RAF Waterbeach in March 1941.

In February 1942 the squadron moved to India with the Wellingtons, and resumed operations in November 1942 against Japanese bases in Burma. From September 1944 the squadron re-equipped with Consolidated Liberators which allowed it to reach targets in Thailand and Malaya. During this period, the squadron included a significant number of Royal Australian Air Force (RAAF) and Royal Canadian Air Force aircrew personnel, attached to it under the British Commonwealth Air Training Plan. The squadron moved to the Cocos Islands in August 1945 to prepare for the planned invasion of Malaya. After the Japanese surrender the squadron disbanded there on 15 November 1945.

Post war

The Squadron was reformed again on 17 November 1945 at RAF Lyneham, Wiltshire, as a transport squadron, equipped with the Avro York. In that rôle it contributed to the Berlin Airlift.

The unit continued in the transport rôle from 1949 to 1959 with the Handley Page Hastings, which was normally used as a transport aircraft but, as the squadron also had a tactical support rôle, was also used in 1956 to drop paratroops on Gamil Airfield during the Suez crisis.

From 1959 the squadron flew the Bristol Britannia, initially from Lyneham, then from RAF Brize Norton, Oxfordshire, from June 1970. The unit put the new long range turboprop aircraft to use to evacuate citizens from troublespots all over the world such as Congo 1960, Kuwait 1961, Belize 1961 and Aden 1967. The Squadron was disbanded on 6 January 1976, following the 1974 Defence White Paper.

The squadron was reformed again in November 2000, to operate the RAF's C-17s. The first of the squadron's four initial C-17s was delivered to the RAF on 17 May 2001, arriving at Brize Norton on 23 May. One of the first high-profile missions of the squadron was the deployment of Lynx helicopters and support equipment to Macedonia as part of a NATO peacekeeping force. This deployment was codenamed Operation Bessemer.

Previously the RAF had to lease commercial heavy lifters such as the Antonov An-124 to return the aircraft to the UK, or launch a major logistical effort to allow a ferry flight. In any case the C-17 has proved invaluable to the RAF and in December 2009, the Ministry of Defence announced its intention to acquire a seventh aircraft. This was received by the RAF at Boeing's Long Beach, California facility on 16 November 2010. The UK announced the purchase of its eighth C-17 in February 2012.

On 13 January 2013 it was announced that two 99 Squadron C-17s were to be used to transport French military equipment and troops to Mali. On 15 November 2013, a C-17 of 99 Squadron flew to the Philippines to assist with aid efforts there after Typhoon Haiyan.

Aircraft operated

Bases

Commanding officers

See also
 List of Royal Air Force aircraft squadrons

References

Citations

Bibliography

 Bowman, Martin, Bombers Fly East: WWII RAF Operations in the Middle and Far East. Pen & Sword, 2017. .
 Bowyer, Michael J.F. Action Stations: 1. Military airfields of East Anglia. Wellingborough, UK: Patrick Stephens Limited, Second edition, 1990. .
 Bowyer, Michael J.F. and John D.R. Rawlings. Squadron Codes, 1937–56. Cambridge, UK: Patrick Stephens Ltd., 1979. .
 Delve, Ken. The Source Book of the RAF. Shrewsbury, Shropshire, UK: Airlife Publishing, 1994. .
 Edgerley, Squadron Leader A.G. Each Tenacious: A History of No. 99 Squadron (1917–1976). Worcester, UK: Square One Publications, 1993. .
 Flintham, Vic and Andrew Thomas. Combat Codes: A full explanation and listing of British, Commonwealth and Allied air force unit codes since 1938. Shrewsbury, Shropshire, UK: Airlife Publishing Ltd., 2003. .
 Gwynne-Timothy, John R.W. Burma Liberators: RCAF in SEAC. Toronto, Ontario, Canada: Next Level Press, 1991. .
 Halley, James J. The Squadrons of the Royal Air Force & Commonwealth, 1918–1988. Tonbridge, Kent, UK: Air-Britain (Historians) Ltd., 1988. .
 Jefford, C.G. RAF Squadrons, a Comprehensive Record of the Movement and Equipment of all RAF Squadrons and their Antecedents since 1912. Shrewsbury, Shropshire, UK: Airlife Publishing, 2001. .
 Moyes, Philip J.R. Bomber Squadrons of the RAF and their Aircraft. London: Macdonald and Jane's (Publishers) Ltd., 1964 (new edition 1976). .
 Rawlings, John D.R. "Squadron Histories: No. 99". Air Pictorial, November 1961, Vol. 23 No. 11. pp. 339–340, 342.
 Rawlings, John D.R. Coastal, Support and Special Squadrons of the RAF and their Aircraft. London: Jane's Publishing Company Ltd., 1982. .
 Renneles, Keith. Independent Force: The War Diary of the Daylight Squadrons of the Independent Air Force  6th June –11th December 1918. London: Grub Street, 2002. .
 Richards, Denis. Royal Air Force 1939–1945: Volume I: The Fight at Odds. London: Her Majestys Stationery Office, 1953.
 Shores, Christopher. Air War For Burma. London: Grun Street, 2005. .
 Ward, Chris and Steve Smith. 3 Group Bomber Command: An Operational History. Barnsley, UK: Pen and Sword, 2008. .

External links

 
 
 

099 Squadron
099 Squadron
Bomber squadrons of the Royal Air Force in World War II
Military units and formations established in 1917
1917 establishments in the United Kingdom
Military units and formations in British Malaya in World War II
Transport units and formations of the Royal Air Force